Lester Towns (born August 28, 1977) is a former American football linebacker in the National Football League. He has played for the Carolina Panthers, Arizona Cardinals and Miami Dolphins. He graduated from Pasadena High School in 1995, and subsequently played college football at the University of Washington.

Towns was drafted by the Carolina Panthers in the seventh round in 2000.

After his career, Towns was an assistant coach at University of Alabama. He is currently the head coach of LA Valley Community College.

References

1977 births
Living people
American football linebackers
Carolina Panthers players
Arizona Cardinals players
Miami Dolphins players
Washington Huskies football players
Pasadena High School (California) alumni
Players of American football from Los Angeles
Players of American football from Pasadena, California